C. V Ganesan is an Indian Tamil politician from the Dravida Munnetra Kazhagam (DMK). He was elected twice (2016 and 2021) as a member of the Tamil Nadu Legislative Assembly from Tittakudi. Since May 2021, he is serving as Tamil Nadu's Minister for Labour Welfare and Skill Development.

Early life 
Ganesan was born to  P. Venkattan on 16 June 1959 in Kaludur (a village now in Cuddalore district).

Education 
Ganesan obtained his undergraduate degree from Muthurangam Government Arts College (Vellore). He also got a Bachelor of Laws (BL) degree from Government Law College, Tiruchirapalli, and a Diploma in Cooperative management (D.Coop) from Swamiyappa Co-operative Institute, Vellore.

In May 1984, he got Master of Arts degree from the University of Madras. In December 1986, he got his Bachelor of Education (B.Ed) from Annamalai University (Chidambaram, Cuddalore district).

Politics

Party posts 
He has been  associated with the DMK since around 1984, and was an active Member of the party's Youth Wing.

Elections contested

Ministership (2021-) 
On 6 September 2021, Ganesan tabled the right to sit amendment to the Tamil Nadu Shops and Establishments Act, 1947.

Personal life 
Ganesan married G. Bavani on 10 June 1984. The couple had one son and four daughters. Bavani died on 9 December 2021.

References 

Living people
Tamil Nadu MLAs 2021–2026
Tamil Nadu MLAs 2016–2021
Tamil Nadu politicians
Indian Tamil people
1959 births